The Coca-Cola Twelve Hours of Sebring, International Grand Prix of Endurance, was the second round of the 1981 IMSA GT Championship and 1981 World Sportscar Championship. The race was held at the Sebring International Raceway, on March 21, 1981. Victory overall went to the No. 9 Personalized Autohaus Porsche 934 driven by Wayne Baker, Jim Mullen, and Kees Nierop.

Race results
Class winners in bold.

Class Winners

References

12 Hours of Sebring
12 Hours of Sebring
12 Hours Of Sebring
12 Hours Of Sebring
Sebring